William Lea may refer to:
 William Lea (businessman) (1805–1876), American businessman, responsible for the development of the Brandywine Mills
 William E. Lea (1907–1970), British philatelist
 William C. Lea (1833–1911), farmer and political figure on Prince Edward Island
 William Lea (priest) (1820–1889), English Anglican priest
 William N'Jo Léa (born 1962), French footballer

See also
 William Lee (disambiguation)